Luobi Cave is a karst cave under the west face of Yin Ridge located  north east of Lizhigou Town,  from Sanya City, Hainan Province, People's Republic of China.

Features

History
A number of inscriptions carved into the walls of the cave are believed to date to the Yuan Dynasty (1271–1368). One of these refers to the precise date of 1283 CE.  Luobi Cave is later mentioned in Ming Dynasty records for Hainan compiled at the time of the Zhengde Emperor (r. 1505–1525 CE) which note the cave's stalactites and their unending flow of water.

Archaeological finds
They discovered eight fossilised human teeth, stone and bone tools, as well as several hundred fossilised animal bones, more than 70,000 sea shells and evidence of ancient fires. Radiocarbon dating techniques show that the finds are from the late Upper Paleolithic era around 10,000 years ago and represent the earliest evidence of human activity in Hainan as well as the southernmost occurrence of stone tools from this period. Very few fossilised fish bones were discovered at the Luobi site, indicating that the inhabitants of the cave had yet to master the skill of fishing. The few fish they did obtain were probably found in rocky pools along the coast having been swept ashore.

Since 2001 the Luobi Cave has been a national protected cultural site.

Folklore
According to legend, anyone coming into contact with water dripping from Luobi Cave's stalactites will become a talented writer whilst a number of large flat rocks scattered across the floor of the cave are said to be inkstones once used by Taoist Immortals. The smaller Xianlang Cave nearby is claimed to have been the home of female immortal who descended from heaven and married a man from the local Li minority.

See also
List of caves in China
List of longest caves

References

Caves of Hainan
Karst caves
Karst formations of China
Tourist attractions in Sanya
Major National Historical and Cultural Sites in Hainan
Archaeological sites in China
Paleolithic China